Syzygium quadribracteatum is a species of plant in the family Myrtaceae. It is endemic to Peninsular Malaysia.

References

quadribracteatum
Endemic flora of Peninsular Malaysia
Taxonomy articles created by Polbot
Taxobox binomials not recognized by IUCN